Luka Menalo (born 22 July 1996) is a Bosnian professional footballer who plays as a winger for Croatian League club Dinamo Zagreb and the Bosnia and Herzegovina national team.

Menalo started his senior career at Čapljina, before joining Široki Brijeg in 2014. He moved to Dinamo Zagreb in 2018, who loaned him to Slaven Belupo, Olimpija Ljubljana and Rijeka over the course of the next three seasons, respectively.

A former youth international for Bosnia and Herzegovina, Menalo made his senior international debut in 2018.

Club career

Early career
Menalo was born in Split, but grew up in Čapljina. He made his senior debut for HNK Čapljina against Mladost on 2 March 2014 at the age of 17. On 14 May, he scored his first senior goal against Igman Konjic.

In the summer of 2014, Menalo switched to Široki Brijeg. In January 2015, he signed a professional contract with the team until 2020. Menalo scored his first career hat-trick on 21 September 2016, in a game against his former club Čapljina. Menalo was voted the best young player of the league in his last two seasons with Široki Brijeg.

Dinamo Zagreb
In February 2018, Croatian side Dinamo Zagreb announced that Menalo would join them the following season on a five-year contract. He made his competitive debut for the club against Rudeš on 27 July 2018.

In January 2019, Menalo was loaned to Slaven Belupo until the end of the 2018–19 season.

In July 2019, he was sent on a season-long loan to Slovenian PrvaLiga side Olimpija Ljubljana.

Menalo scored a hat-trick in the 2020–21 Croatian Cup win over Ferdinandovac on 26 September 2020, which were his first goals for Dinamo Zagreb.

In October 2020, he was sent on a season-long loan to Rijeka. He scored 10 goals in 36 appearances for the club in all competitions.

After returning from loan, Menalo scored a brace for Dinamo in a triumph over Hrvatski Dragovoljac in October 2021, his first league goals with the club.

International career
Menalo represented Bosnia and Herzegovina at under-19 and under-21 level. As he was born in Croatia and is of Croatian descent, he could have represented Croatia, but declined the offers.

In January 2018, he received his first senior call-up, for friendly games against the United States and Mexico. Menalo debuted in a goalless draw against the former on 28 January. On 7 September 2021, Menalo scored his first goal for the national team in the 2022 FIFA World Cup qualification match against Kazakhstan, putting Bosnia and Herzegovina 2–1 ahead in an eventual 2–2 draw.

Career statistics

Club

International

Scores and results list Bosnia and Herzegovina's goal tally first, score column indicates score after each Menalo goal.

Honours
Dinamo Zagreb
Croatian First League: 2021–22

Široki Brijeg
Bosnian Cup: 2016–17

References

External links

1996 births
Living people
Footballers from Split, Croatia
People from Čapljina
Bosnia and Herzegovina footballers
Bosnia and Herzegovina international footballers
Bosnia and Herzegovina youth international footballers
Bosnia and Herzegovina under-21 international footballers
Croatian footballers
Bosnia and Herzegovina expatriate footballers
Association football wingers
HNK Čapljina players
NK Široki Brijeg players
GNK Dinamo Zagreb players
NK Slaven Belupo players
NK Olimpija Ljubljana (2005) players
GNK Dinamo Zagreb II players
HNK Rijeka players
First League of the Federation of Bosnia and Herzegovina players
Premier League of Bosnia and Herzegovina players
Croatian Football League players
Slovenian PrvaLiga players
First Football League (Croatia) players
Expatriate footballers in Slovenia
Bosnia and Herzegovina expatriate sportspeople in Slovenia
Croats of Bosnia and Herzegovina